The Kilwa sharp-snouted worm lizard (Ancylocranium ionidesi) is a worm lizard species in the family Amphisbaenidae. It is endemic to Tanzania.

Etymology
The specific name, ionidesi, is in honor of British game warden Constantine John Philip Ionides (1901–1968), who was known as the "Snake Man of British East Africa"..

References

Ancylocranium
Reptiles described in 1955
Endemic fauna of Tanzania
Reptiles of Tanzania
Taxa named by Arthur Loveridge